The Eliza R. Snow Performing Arts Center is a performing arts center located at Brigham Young University-Idaho in Rexburg, Idaho, United States.  The building is home to the Music and Performing Arts departments of BYU-Idaho, as well as the famed 700-seat Barrus Concert Hall. It also has a 500-seat drama theatre.

Among the musical instruments housed in the center is the Keith Martindale Stefan Memorial Organ which was dedicated by L. Tom Perry in 1984. The Mormon Tabernacle Choir also broadcast Music and the Spoken Word from the Snow center that same day.

See also
 List of concert halls
 Eliza R. Snow

Notes

External links
 BYU-Idaho Dance Department Web Page
 BYU-Idaho Music Department Web Page
 BYU-Idaho Theatre Department Web Page

Brigham Young University–Idaho
University and college arts centers in the United States
Performing arts centers in Idaho
Buildings and structures in Madison County, Idaho
Tourist attractions in Madison County, Idaho